Jairo Montaño (born July 9, 1979) is a football defender. He currently plays for Barcelona Sporting Club.

External links
 

1979 births
Living people
Sportspeople from Guayaquil
Association football defenders
Ecuadorian footballers
Ecuador international footballers
Delfín S.C. footballers
Manta F.C. footballers
L.D.U. Portoviejo footballers
S.D. Quito footballers
Barcelona S.C. footballers